Margarete Gütschow (1871–1951) was a German classical archaeologist. She was one of the first women to work professionally as an architect, collaborating with the German Archaeological Institute in Rome from 1910. In 1928, she began studying classical architecture at the University of Berlin but did not complete her doctorate. Instead, in 1925 she returned to Rome, assisting Gerhart Rodenwaldt (1886–1945) in investigating funerary sculpture, a topic which became the focus of her subsequent work.

Publications
 Ein Kindersarkophag mit Darstellung aus der Argonautensage, 1928
 Sarkophag-Studien, I., 1931
 La chiesa vaticana di San Stefano Maggiore; trovamenti e restauri. Das Museum der Prätextat-Katakombe [di] M. Gütschow., 1934
 Das Prätertatmuseum in Rom und seine Bedeutung für die Kunst der Spätantike, 1937
 Das Museum der Prätextat-Katakombe, 1938

References

1871 births
1951 deaths
Architects from Lübeck
Archaeologists from Lübeck
German women archaeologists
German women scientists
20th-century archaeologists
20th-century non-fiction writers
20th-century German women writers
German women architects